Adebisi Akanji (born 1930s) is a Nigerian artist as well as the Olúwo (Ògbóni chief priest) of Ilédì Lárọ̀ Ohùntótó - the main Ògbóni Ìbílẹ̀ lodge of Òṣogbo, capital of Ọ̀ṣun State, Nigeria.

Early life and education 
In his early life he worked as a bricklayer, and first began to create sculptures as part of a competition to sculpt cement animals based on traditional architectural elements in Yoruba houses.

Career 
Akanji is best known for his open-faced cement screens and other sculptural work. He has also worked in textiles. His work often illustrates themes from Yoruba folklore. In collaboration with Susanne Wenger, he worked for a decade on the Osun shrine in Osogbo, Nigeria, and is responsible for many of the shrine's sculptural elements.

References

External links 

20th-century Nigerian sculptors
Yoruba artists
1930s births
Living people
Nigerian bricklayers
21st-century Nigerian artists
21st-century sculptors
Male sculptors
Year of birth missing (living people)
Yoruba people